Uncía is a town located in the Potosí Department of Bolivia. It is the capital of the Uncía Municipality and Rafael Bustillo Province.

References 

Populated places in Potosí Department